Gilles Simon was the defending champion, and won in the final 6–3, 6–4, against Carlos Moyá.

Seeds

Draw

Finals

Top half

Bottom half

External links
Draw
Qualifying draw

Singles